Carl Daniel Jenkinson (born 8 February 1992) is an English professional footballer who plays as a right-back for Newcastle Jets in the Australian A-League.

Jenkinson began his career with Charlton Athletic before joining Arsenal in 2011. He spent the 2014–15 and 2015–16 seasons on loan at West Ham United, but his second spell was cut short by a mid-season cruciate ligament injury. He spent the 2017–18 season on loan to Championship club Birmingham City. He represented both England and Finland at youth level before making his debut for the senior England team in 2012.

Club career

Charlton Athletic
Jenkinson joined Charlton Athletic as a seven-year-old, and took up a scholarship in 2008. He joined Conference South club Welling United on work experience terms in January 2010, and made ten league appearances.

He signed his first professional contract in 2010, and was named in a Charlton squad for the first time for their 4–3 League Cup defeat away to Shrewsbury Town in August. In November, he started a three-month loan with Conference Premier club Eastbourne Borough. He made five appearances in the first month, including a man-of-the-match performance in the FA Trophy against Boreham Wood, before being recalled by Charlton. He went straight into the starting eleven at right-back for the Football League Trophy Southern Section semi-final clash with Brentford at Griffin Park, and played the whole match as Brentford won the penalty shoot-out after a goalless draw. Jenkinson was given his Football League debut by Chris Powell on 15 February 2011; he replaced Simon Francis after 52 minutes of a 2–1 League One defeat at Hartlepool United. He made seven more league appearances that season, all as a starter.

Arsenal

2011–12 season
Jenkinson signed for Arsenal in June 2011, for an undisclosed fee thought to be around £1 million.

On 16 August, he made his competitive debut in the final qualifying round of the UEFA Champions League against Udinese, as a 55th-minute substitute for the injured left-back Johan Djourou. He made his Premier League debut against Liverpool, four days later, starting at right-back. Jenkinson kept his place in the team, starting in the second leg against Udinese and then in an eventful Premier League fixture against Manchester United at Old Trafford. He crossed for Robin van Persie to score Arsenal's second goal of a match that United won 8–2, but was sent off three minutes later for a second yellow card. According to the Guardian player ratings, he had "no protection in front of him, no guidance to the side of him and gave a hapless display as a consequence." Jenkinson played regularly after Bacary Sagna broke a leg in October, but suffered a stress fracture in his lower back which kept him out for three months. He made his return in the North London Derby against Tottenham Hotspur on 26 February 2012, playing the last 15 minutes of a 5–2 victory, but appeared only twice more in what remained of the season.

2012–13 season

With Sagna still unavailable through injury, Jenkinson was a regular starter in the first couple of months of the 2012–13 season. His performances improved, earning appreciation from teammates, media, and the England manager.

Jenkinson and teammates Alex Oxlade-Chamberlain, Kieran Gibbs, Aaron Ramsey and Jack Wilshere all signed new long-term contracts with Arsenal in December 2012. He made only six more appearances in the rest of the season; in one of the six, a 1–0 win away to Sunderland on 9 February which he started only because Laurent Koscielny was injured in the warm-up, he was sent off after being booked twice for a "lunge" on Jack Colback and a "clumsy challenge" on Stéphane Sessègnon.

On 13 March, Jenkinson played the full 90 minutes as Arsenal beat Bayern Munich at the Allianz Arena.

2013–14 season
Jenkinson featured in all three of Arsenal's opening matches of the 2013–14 campaign as injuries to defenders Thomas Vermaelen and Koscielny forced Sagna to fill in at centre-back and Jenkinson to deputise at right-back. Despite Koscielny later returning, Jenkinson kept his place in the first-team after impressing against Fenerbahçe.

On 11 May 2014, Jenkinson scored his first senior team goal for Arsenal in their 2–0 victory over Norwich City on the last day of the 2013–14 season.

In a campaign where Arsenal won their first trophy since 2005, Jenkinson played the full 90 minutes in the FA Cup matches against Coventry and Liverpool whilst he appeared as a substitute in the quarter final victory against Everton.

West Ham United loans
On 31 July 2014, Jenkinson joined fellow London-based top-flight club West Ham United for a season-long loan deal. He suffered a pre-season hamstring injury in August, in a match in the Schalke 04 Cup against Málaga, and did not make his debut for West Ham until 15 September, in a 2–2 away draw against Hull City. Jenkinson quickly established himself as the team's first-choice right-back and impressed pundits and fans with his consistent displays and good form.

After signing a new long-term contract with Arsenal in July 2015, Jenkinson rejoined West Ham United on loan for a second season. On 15 August, he played in goal for the final moments of a 2–1 home defeat to Leicester City when Adrián had been sent off with no substitutions remaining. A week later, Jenkinson himself was sent off for a foul on Max Gradel in a 4–3 home defeat to AFC Bournemouth. He scored his first West Ham goal on 3 October in a 2–2 away draw against Sunderland. With West Ham losing 2–0 in first-half added time, he scored from Victor Moses' cross to make the score 2–1. Jenkinson suffered a "significant" knee injury on 23 January 2016, after clashing with Sergio Agüero in a home 2–2 draw against Manchester City. It was confirmed as an ACL injury, and Jenkinson returned to Arsenal for rehabilitation.

2016–17 season
Before the opening match of the 2016–17 season, Arsène Wenger stated that Jenkinson was expected to be fit for first-team action in November. He made his first appearance for Arsenal since 2014 slightly ahead of schedule, on 25 October, starting at right-back in the team's 2–0 League Cup win over Reading. He received plaudits for his performance which was focused more on attack than defence and he had a chance early on to open the scoring. Jenkinson played in four matches in November, but after the lastthe League Cup quarter-final loss to Southampton in which he made an error that cost Arsenal a goal and his substitution was cheered by Arsenal fansWenger suggested that he lacked confidence and needed to regain his competitiveness away from the spotlight. Jenkinson himself disagreed, and concluded that if he was out of the team, he needed to move to a club where he would play regularly. In the January 2017 transfer window, a fee was agreed for a permanent move to Crystal Palace, managed by Sam Allardyce with whom Jenkinson had worked at West Ham, but the player could not agree personal terms. He remained at Arsenal for the rest of the season, but did not play for the first team.

2017–18 season: Birmingham City loan
On 21 August 2017, Jenkinson and fellow Arsenal full-back Cohen Bramall joined Championship club Birmingham City on loan for the 2017–18 season. He was given squad number 22. Jenkinson hoped that regular football would restart his stagnating career. After half an hour of his debut, playing at right-back five days later at home to Reading, Jenkinson dislocated a shoulder in a collision with teammate Michael Morrison and was expected to be "out long-term". He made his return to the first team when he started the FA Cup tie against Huddersfield Town on 27 January 2018, and earned a league start two weeks later, replacing the injured Jonathan Grounds. After five more starts, he lost his place, new manager Garry Monk preferring the inexperienced but promising Wes Harding.

2018–19 season
Jenkinson remained at Arsenal at the start of the 2018–19 season, the final year of his contract with the club. Under new head coach Unai Emery, Jenkinson made eight appearances across all competitions. 

Arsenal didn't concede a single goal whilst Jenkinson was on the pitch in each of their last 3 UEFA Europa League group stage matches against Sporting CP, Vorskla and Qarabag.

On 27 February, he started his first Premier League match for Arsenal in 830 days, playing the full 90 minutes in a 5–1 win over Bournemouth at the Emirates Stadium.

Nottingham Forest
On 7 August 2019, Jenkinson signed a three-year deal with Championship club Nottingham Forest for an undisclosed fee. He featured irregularly for Forest under both Sabri Lamouchi and Chris Hughton, being used mainly as a rotation option. At the end of the 2020–21 season, Jenkinson was told that he was not in Hughton's plans and was free to leave the club.

On 19 January 2022, Jenkinson joined Australian A-League side Melbourne City on loan until the end of the season. On 10 June 2022, Nottingham Forest announced Jenkinson would be leaving the club once his contract expired.

Melbourne City loan
Jenkinson made his first A-League appearance as a substitute against Central Coast Mariners. He scored his first goal for the club less than 20 minutes after coming on to replace Kerrin Stokes.

On 18 February, Jenkinson scored again, this time against Newcastle. Jenkinson played in all of the remaining fixtures as Melbourne City finished the season as 'Premiers'. 

Melbourne City crashed out of the 2022 AFC Champions League despite being undefeated in the group stage. Jenkinson scored one goal in six matches, against Jeonnam Dragons.

Newcastle Jets 
In August 2022, Jenkinson signed for A-League side Newcastle Jets on a two-year contract.

International career
Jenkinson has an English father and a Finnish-Swede mother, and represented both England and Finland at youth international level.

Jenkinson played for England at under-17 level, but then switched his allegiances to Finland at under-18 level. He was part of the team that competed at the 2010 Granatkin Memorial tournament, at which he made three appearances and captained the team in the 1–0 defeat by Ukraine. He also made an appearance for the Finland under-21 team on 3 June 2011 in a 2013 European Championship qualifying match that resulted in a 0–0 draw with Malta.

In October 2012, England manager Roy Hodgson confirmed that Jenkinson had trained with the senior team prior to their World Cup qualifier against Poland, after fellow right-back Kyle Walker withdrew, and that the player had elected to make himself available for England rather than Finland in future, despite the increased competition for places. He made his senior debut for England on 14 November, as a 74th-minute substitute for Glen Johnson in a 4–2 friendly defeat against Sweden.

In October 2013, Jenkinson was first called up to the England U21 squad for European Championship qualifiers against Lithuania and San Marino. He kept his place in the squad for the following qualifiers, one of which was against his former team Finland U21, a match in which he started.

Personal life
Jenkinson was born in Harlow, Essex, to an English father, Steve, and a Finnish-Swedish mother, Hayde; he has an older brother, Marc. He was raised in Buckhurst Hill, and attended Davenant Foundation School in nearby Loughton. Jenkinson is a boyhood Arsenal fan, and attended matches with his father and brother.

Career statistics

Club

International

Honours
Arsenal
FA Cup: 2013–14
UEFA Europa League runner-up: 2018–19

Melbourne City

A League Premiership: 2021/22

References

External links

Profile at the Nottingham Forest F.C. website

1992 births
Living people
Sportspeople from Harlow
English footballers
England youth international footballers
England under-21 international footballers
England international footballers
Finnish footballers
Finland youth international footballers
Finland under-21 international footballers
Association football defenders
Charlton Athletic F.C. players
Welling United F.C. players
Eastbourne Borough F.C. players
Arsenal F.C. players
West Ham United F.C. players
Birmingham City F.C. players
Nottingham Forest F.C. players
Melbourne City FC players
Newcastle Jets FC players
National League (English football) players
English Football League players
Premier League players
English people of Finnish descent
Finnish people of English descent
Outfield association footballers who played in goal
English expatriate footballers
Expatriate soccer players in Australia
English expatriate sportspeople in Australia
A-League Men players